CJOS-FM was a Canadian radio station, which aired at 92.7 FM in Caronport, Saskatchewan. Owned and operated by Briercrest Bible College, the station aired a predominantly Christian campus radio format.

The station launched in 1995, but ceased broadcasting and relinquished its license in 2006.

References

External links
 

Jos
Jos
Jos
Jos
Radio stations established in 1995
Radio stations disestablished in 2006
1995 establishments in Saskatchewan
2006 disestablishments in Saskatchewan
JOS-FM